Mark Jennings may refer to:

 Mark Jennings (politician) (born 1961), member of the Wyoming House of Representatives
 Mark Jennings (rugby union) (born 1993), English rugby union player
 One of two television characters:
 Mark Jennings (Dynasty 1981), from the 1980s prime time soap opera Dynasty
 Mark Jennings (Dynasty 2017), from the 2017 reboot series Dynasty